Johanna Hofer (born Johanna Therese Stern; 30 July 1896 – 30 June 1988) was a German film actress. She appeared in 34 films between 1926 and 1982.

Biography
Hofer was born in Berlin. She was the daughter of engineer and later director of AEG Georg Stern and his wife Lisbeth (née Schmidt), who was the younger sister of artist Käthe Kollwitz. Hofer's younger sisters were dancer Katta Sterna and  actress Maria Matray. Hofer's father was Jewish and her mother was Lutheran. In 1932, Hofer and her husband, Austrian actor Fritz Kortner, left Germany and lived in Switzerland, then Austria and the United Kingdom, before settling in the United States in 1938. In 1941, the couple moved from New York City to Los Angeles.

Filmography

References

External links

German film actresses
1896 births
1988 deaths
German people of Jewish descent
Actresses from Berlin
20th-century German actresses
German television actresses
German stage actresses
Burials at Munich Waldfriedhof